KKD may refer to:
 Kirkcudbrightshire, historic county in Scotland, Chapman code
 Krispy Kreme Doughnuts Inc., NYSE stock symbol until 2016
 Kirkdale railway station, Liverpool, England, National Rail station code